The Luodong Bo-ai Hospital (also spelled Bo'ai) is a hospital in Luodong Township, Yilan County, Taiwan. There are three teaching hospitals in this region; Luodong Bo-ai Hospital is the largest, with over 1,000 beds, and 1,400 members of staff.

History
The hospital originated in 1953 with 30 beds in a small-scale hospital building.

Specialties
 Internal Medicine Group
 Surgical Specialties Group
 Other Specialties Group

See also
 Healthcare in Taiwan
 List of hospitals in Taiwan

References

External links 
Luodong Bo-ai Hospital

1953 establishments in Taiwan
Buildings and structures in Yilan County, Taiwan
Hospital buildings completed in 1953
Hospitals in Taiwan